The 2006 SMU Mustangs football team represented Southern Methodist University (SMU) as a member the West Division of Conference USA (C-USA) during the 2006 NCAA Division I FBS football season. Led by fifth-year head coach Phil Bennett, the Mustangs compiled an overall record of 6–6 with a mark of 4–4 in conference play, placing fourth in C-USA's West Division.

Schedule

Roster

References

SMU
SMU Mustangs football seasons
SMU Mustangs football